Jacopo Dall'Oglio (born 2 April 1992) is an Italian footballer who plays for Italian Serie C club Avellino.

Biography
Born in Milazzo, Sicily, Dall'Oglio started his career at another side of the Strait of Messina. In 2011, he was signed by Pavia. On 7 July 2012 Dall'Oglio was signed by Barletta. He followed Reggina relegated to 2014–15 Lega Pro. The club was excluded from the professional leagues in July 2015.

On 10 July 2015 Dall'Oglio was signed by Brescia. He wore no.31 shirt for Brescia in 2015–16 Serie B.

On 24 July 2019 he signed a 3-year contract with Serie C club Catania.

He then left Catania for Sicilian rivals Palermo, being part of the squad that won promotion to Serie B following the 2021–22 season. On 27 July 2022, he left Palermo to join Serie C side Avellino.

Career statistics

Club

References

External links
 AIC profile (data by football.it) 

Italian footballers
Reggina 1914 players
F.C. Pavia players
A.S.D. Barletta 1922 players
Brescia Calcio players
Catania S.S.D. players
Palermo F.C. players
U.S. Avellino 1912 players
Serie B players
Serie C players
Association football midfielders
People from Milazzo
Sportspeople from the Province of Messina
1992 births
Living people
Footballers from Sicily